Serazapine (developmental code name CGS-15040A) is a serotonin 5-HT2 receptor antagonist that was investigated as a potential treatment for generalized anxiety disorder in the 1990s. In humans, serazapine was well tolerated at doses of 10 to 40 mg and was found to be superior to placebo for reducing anxiety symptoms as indicated by HAM-A scores. However, clinical development was discontinued.

References

5-HT2 antagonists
Abandoned drugs
Anxiolytics
Heterocyclic compounds with 5 rings
Nitrogen heterocycles